The Frick Art Reference Library is the research arm of The Frick Collection. Its reference services have temporarily relocated to the Breuer building at 945 Madison Avenue, called Frick Madison, during the renovation of the Frick's historic buildings at 10 East 71st Street (between Madison and Fifth Avenue) in New York City. The library was founded in 1920 and it offers public access to materials on the study of art and art history in the Western tradition from the fourth to the mid-twentieth century.  It is open to visitors 16 years of age or older and serves the greater art and art history research community through its membership in the New York Art Resources Consortium (which also includes the libraries of the Brooklyn Museum and The Museum of Modern Art). 

Within the library is the Center for the History of Collecting—a research organization that supports the study of the formation of collections of fine and decorative arts, both public and private, from Colonial times to the present through its fellowships, symposia, and publications.

History 
Helen Clay Frick founded the Library in 1920 as a memorial to her father, Henry Clay Frick, who died in 1919. Its first home was the bowling alley of the Frick residence, which is now The Frick Collection. In 1924, the library was relocated from the bowling alley to a one-story building at 6 East 71st Street, designed by the architecture firm, Carrère and Hastings. The library opened to the public in its current building on January 14, 1935.

Collections 
The collections held at the Frick Art Reference Library focus on art of the Western tradition from the fourth century (A.D.) to the mid twentieth century (A.D.), and chiefly include information about paintings, drawings, sculpture, prints, and illuminated manuscripts. Archival materials augment its research collections. The Library holds more than 228,000 monograph and 3,300 periodical titles. The collection includes several highlights: an auction catalog collection that contains approximately 90,000 items; the Frick Art Reference Library Photoarchive which holds more than 1.2 million images including photographs and clippings of works of art; and the electronic resources collection which consists of more than 2,000 subscription databases and e-journals, as well as e-books.

Center for the History of Collecting 
In 2007, the library established its Center for the History of Collecting. It operates with the goal of encouraging and sustaining research on the development of public and private art collections in Europe and the United States, from the early modern period to the present.

The Center supports a broad range of intellectual initiatives; it organizes and hosts a regular calendar of symposia, specialist lectures, and study days, and it contributes to undergraduate and graduate seminars taught in collaboration with local colleges. It also offers long and short term fellowships in the history of collecting, which attract scholars researching diverse aspects of cultural history. In addition, the center created and continues to expand a major digital archive of art collectors and dealers, and it is collaborating on the creation of software that will aid in the study of visual history. The Center has an active publications program and awards a biennial book prize for excellent contributions to the History of Collecting in America.

From its inception under the leadership of founding director Inge Reist, the Center has had an advisory committee consisting of academics, collectors, librarians, archivists, and curators. In 2014, a Fellows Committee was introduced to garner financial support and to gather a dedicated community of individuals interested in engaging with collecting practices, especially through visits to the homes of private collectors.

Symposia, Lectures, and Publications 

Between 2007- 2015, the Center organized the following symposia on the history of collecting:

 May 2015 – Seen through the Collector’s Lens: 150 Years of Photography
 January 2015 – El Greco Comes to America: The Discovery of a Modern Old Master
 May 2014 – The Americas Revealed: Collecting Colonial and Modern Latin American Art in the United States
 September 2013 – Going for Baroque: Americans Collect Italian Paintings of the 17th and 18th Centuries
 March 2013 – Money for the Most Exquisite Things: Bankers and Collecting from the Medici to the Rockefellers
 March 2012 – The Dragon and the Chrysanthemum: Collecting Chinese and Japanese Art in America
 May 6, 2011 – Reflections across the Pond: British Models of Art Collecting and the American Response
 November 2010 – A Market for Merchant Princes: Collecting Italian Renaissance Paintings in America
 March 2010 – The Collector’s Choice: Art on Display in American Private Collections
 May 2009 – Holland’s Golden Age in America: Collecting the Art of Rembrandt, Vermeer and Hals
 March 2009 – The American Artist as Collector: From the Enlightenment to the Post-War Era
 November 2008 – Collecting Spanish Art: Spain’s Golden Age and America’s Gilded Age
 April 2008 – Power Underestimated: American Women Art Collectors
 February- March 2008 – Turning Points: Modern Art Collecting 1913-
 May 19, 2007 – Turning Points in Old Masters Collecting, 1830- 1940

The Center has an active publication program, issuing books that draw on the scholarship presented in the symposia. Many of these have been published in association with Pennsylvania State University Press as volumes of The Frick Collection Studies on the History of Art Collecting in America. Titles include:

 Reist, Inge Jackson., and Rosella Mamoli Zorzi, eds. Power Underestimated: American Women Art Collectors. Venezia: Marsilio, 2011.
 Reist, Inge Jackson., and José Luis Colomer, eds. Collecting Spanish Art: Spain's Golden Age and America's Gilded Age. New York: Frick Collection in Association with Centro De Estudios Europa Hispánica, Madrid, and Center for Spain in America, New York, 2012.
 Reist, Inge, ed. British Models of Art Collecting and the American Response: Reflections Across the Pond. Burlington: Ashgate, 2014.
 Quodbach, Esmée, ed. Holland's Golden Age in America: Celebrating the Art of Rembrandt, Vermeer, and Hals. University Park, PA: Pennsylvania State University Press, 2014.
 Reist, Inge, ed. A Market for Merchant Princes: Collecting Italian Renaissance Paintings in America. University Park, PA: Pennsylvania State University Press, 2015.

The Center also organizes special events such as movie showings and lectures by important scholars, artists, and collectors. For instance, in 2013, the center presented a lecture by artist and author Edmund de Waal, and in 2014, it hosted a conversation between Sir David Cannadine, Lord Rothschild, and Duke of Devonshire.

Collaborations 

The Center regularly collaborates with academic institutions, including Barnard College, Columbia University, and New York University's Institute of Fine Arts, to offer graduate and undergraduate seminars and graduate workshops on the history of collecting. Alongside local museums, it also organizes and participates in study days that contextualize major museum exhibitions within the history of collecting. In addition, it facilitates oral and video histories of dealers and collectors who have helped to shape American collecting through the twentieth century. In this effort, it has partnered with the Archives of American Art on a two-year project to produce a series of oral histories of collectors.

Digital Scholarship 
The Center maintains an archives directory, which is a growing index of collectors, dealers, auction houses and galleries, presented with historical notes and with the locations of their archival materials. In 2011, the Art Libraries Society of North America awarded the Archives Directory its annual Worldwide Books Award for Electronic Resources, which recognizes achievements in digital librarianship or in curating visual resources. The center is also currently collaborating with scholars at the NYU Polytechnic School of Engineering to develop a digital platform that will facilitate the storage, comparison, and manipulation of digital images.

Prizes and Fellowships 
Each year, the Center grants a total of six short-term and long-term fellowships to pre- and post-doctoral scholars focusing on the history of collecting. It also awards a biennial book prize for a distinguished publication on the history of collecting in America. The book prize honorees include:

 2013, Jennifer Farrell, Get There First, Decide Promptly: The Richard Brown Baker Collection of Postwar Art, New Haven: Yale University Art Gallery, 2011 (Prize shared with essayists Thomas Crow, Serge Guilbaut, Jan Howard, Robert Storr, and Judith Tannenbaum)
 2011, Mary L. Levkoff, Hearst, the Collector, New York: Abrams, 2008.
 2009, Julia Meech, Frank Lloyd Wright and the Art of Japan: The Architect's Other Passion, New York: Harry N. Abrams, 2001.

List of Chief Librarians

There have been seven Chief Librarians (known as the Andrew W. Mellon Chief Librarian since 1990) of the Frick Art Reference Library:
 Stephen J. Bury, 2010 to present
 Patricia Barnett, 1995 to 2008
 Helen Sanger, 1978 to 1994 (the first Andrew W. Mellon Chief Librarian)
 Mildred Steinbach, 1970 to 1977
 Hannah Johnson Howell, 1947 to 1970
 Ethelwyn Manning, 1924 to 1947
 Ruth Savord, 1920 to 1924

References

External links 

 The Frick Collection
Frick Center for the History of Collecting, Official Website
 Frick Art Reference Library materials on Internet Archive
 FRESCO: Frick Research Catalog Online
The Getty Research Institute, Collecting and Provenance Research
Journal of the History of Collections

 
Libraries in Manhattan
Library buildings completed in 1924
Library buildings completed in 1935
Frick Collection
John Russell Pope buildings
Research libraries in the United States